

British Empire
India – Francis Rawdon-Hastings, 1st Marquess of Hastings, Governor-General of India (1813–1823)
Ionian Islands – Thomas Maitland, Lord High Commissioner (1816–1823)
 Malta Colony – Thomas Maitland, Governor of Malta (1813–1824)
New South Wales – Major-General Thomas Brisbane, Governor of New South Wales (1821–1825)

Portugal
Angola –
 Joaquim Inácio de Lima, Governor of Angola (1821–1822)
 Military junta (1822–1823)

Spanish Empire
Captaincy General of Cuba –
Nicolás de Mahy y Romo, Governor of Cuba (1821–1822)
Sebastián Kindelán y Oregón, Provisional Governor of Cuba (1822–1823)
Captaincy General of Puerto Rico –
Gonzalo Arostegui y Herrera, Governor of Puerto Rico (1820–1822)
José Navarro (Governor), Governor of Puerto Rico (1822)
Francisco González Linares, Governor of Puerto Rico (1822)
Miguel de la Torre y Pando, conde de Torrepando, Governor of Puerto Rico (1822–1837)
Spanish East Indies –
Mariano Fernández de Folgueras, Governor-General of the Philippines (1816–1822)
Juan Antonio Martínez, Governor-General of the Philippines (1822–1825)
Viceroyalty of Peru – José de la Serna e Hinojosa, 1st Count of los Andes, Viceroy of Peru (1821–1824)

Colonial governors
Colonial governors
1822